Fitampoha is a traditional ceremony of the Sakalava people of Madagascar, taking place every five years at Belo-sur-Tsiribihina. The main ritual of Fitampoha consists in bathing the relics, called dady, of the ancient Sakalava kings in the waters of the Tsiribihina River, once part of the Sakalava kingdom of Menabe. The most venerated of the ancient kings is Andriamisara I, who is considered the common ancestor of both the main Sakalava dynasties, that of Menabe and that of Boina.

References
 Il Fitampoha o il bagno delle reliquie
 Article on Fitampoha at Haisoratra
 Article on Fitampoha at Tranofalafa 2.0

Malagasy culture
Sakalava
Malagasy words and phrases
Rituals
Water and religion